The Peshitta ( or  ) is the standard version of the Bible for churches in the Syriac tradition, including the Maronite Church, the Chaldean Catholic Church, the Syriac Catholic Church, the Syriac Orthodox Church, the Malabar Independent Syrian Church (Thozhiyoor Church), the Syro-Malankara Catholic Church, the Mar Thoma Syrian Church, the Assyrian Church of the East and the Syro-Malabar Church.

The consensus within biblical scholarship, although not universal, is that the Old Testament of the Peshitta was translated into Syriac from Biblical Hebrew, probably in the 2nd century AD, and that the New Testament of the Peshitta was translated from the Greek, probably in the early 5th century. This New Testament, originally excluding certain disputed books (2 Peter, 2 John, 3 John, Jude, Revelation), had become a standard by the early 5th century. The five excluded books were added in the Harklean Version (AD 616) of Thomas of Harqel.

Etymology 
Peshitta is derived from the Syriac mappaqtâ pšîṭtâ (ܡܦܩܬܐ ܦܫܝܛܬܐ), literally meaning "simple version". However, it is also possible to translate pšîṭtâ as "common" (that is, for all people), or "straight", as well as the usual translation as "simple". Syriac is a dialect, or group of dialects, of Eastern Aramaic, originating around Edessa. It is written in the Syriac alphabet and is transliterated into the Latin script in a number of ways, generating different spellings of the name: Peshitta, Peshittâ, Pshitta, Pšittâ, Pshitto, Fshitto. All of these are acceptable, but Peshitta is the most conventional spelling in English.

Brief history 
The Peshitta had from the 5th century onward a wide circulation in the East, and was accepted and honored by the whole diversity of sects of Syriac Christianity. It had a great missionary influence: the Armenian and Georgian versions, as well as the Arabic and the Persian, owe not a little to the Syriac. The famous Nestorian tablet of Chang'an witnesses to the presence of the Syriac scriptures in the heart of China in the 8th century. The Peshitta was first brought to the West by Moses of Mindin, a noted Syrian ecclesiastic who unsuccessfully sought a patron for the work of printing it in Rome and Venice. However, he was successful in finding such a patron in the Imperial Chancellor of the Holy Roman Empire at Vienna in 1555—Albert Widmanstadt. He undertook the printing of the New Testament, and the emperor bore the cost of the special types which had to be cast for its issue in Syriac. Immanuel Tremellius, the converted Jew whose scholarship was so valuable to the English reformers and divines, made use of it, and in 1569 issued a Syriac New Testament in Hebrew letters. In 1645, the editio princeps of the Old Testament was prepared by Gabriel Sionita for the Paris Polyglot, and in 1657 the whole Peshitta found a place in Walton's London Polyglot. For long the best edition of the Peshitta was that of John Leusden and Karl Schaaf, and it is still quoted under the symbol "Syrschaaf", or "SyrSch".

New Testament 
In a detailed examination of Matthew 1–14, Gwilliam found that the Peshitta agrees with the Textus Receptus only 108 times and with the Codex Vaticanus 65 times. Meanwhile, in 137 instances it differs from both, usually with the support of the Old Syriac and the Old Latin, and in 31 instances it stands alone.

A statement by Eusebius that Hegesippus "made some quotations from the Gospel according to the Hebrews and from the Syriac Gospel," means we should have a reference to a Syriac New Testament as early as 160–180 AD, the time of that Hebrew Christian writer. The translation of the New Testament has been admired by Syriac scholars, who have deemed it "careful, faithful, and literal" with it sometimes being referred to as the "Queen of the versions."

Critical edition of the New Testament 
The standard United Bible Societies 1905 edition of the New Testament of the Peshitta was based on editions prepared by Syriacists Philip E. Pusey (d. 1880), George Gwilliam (d. 1914) and John Gwyn. These editions comprised Gwilliam & Pusey's 1901 critical edition of the gospels, Gwilliam's critical edition of Acts, Gwilliam & Pinkerton's critical edition of Paul's Epistles and John Gwynn's critical edition of the General Epistles and later Revelation. This critical Peshitta text is based on a collation of more than seventy Peshitta and a few other Aramaic manuscripts. All 27 books of the common Western Canon of the New Testament are included in this British & Foreign Bible Society's 1905 Peshitta edition, as is the adultery pericope (John 7:53–8:11). The 1979 Syriac Bible, United Bible Society, uses the same text for its New Testament. The Online Bible reproduces the 1905 Syriac Peshitta NT in Hebrew characters.

Translations 
 James Murdock - The New Testament, Or, The Book of the Holy Gospel of Our Lord and God, Jesus the Messiah (1851).
 John Wesley Etheridge - A Literal Translation of the Four Gospels From the Peschito, or Ancient Syriac and The Apostolical Acts and Epistles From the Peschito, or Ancient Syriac: To Which Are Added, the Remaining Epistles and The Book of Revelation, After a Later Syriac Text (1849).
 George M. Lamsa - The Holy Bible From the Ancient Eastern Text (1933)- Contains both the Old and New Testaments according to the Peshitta text. This translation is better known as the Lamsa Bible. He also wrote several other books on the Peshitta and Aramaic primacy such as Gospel Light, New Testament Origin, and Idioms of the Bible, along with a New Testament commentary. To this end, several well-known Evangelical Protestant preachers have used or endorsed the Lamsa Bible, such as Oral Roberts, Billy Graham, and William M. Branham.
 Andumalil Mani Kathanar - Vishudha Grantham. New Testament translation in Malayalam.
 Mathew Uppani C. M. I - Peshitta Bible. Translation (including Old and New Testaments) in Malayalam (1997).
 Arch-corepiscopos Curien Kaniamparambil - Vishudhagrandham. Translation (including Old and New Testaments) in Malayalam.
 Janet Magiera- Aramaic Peshitta New Testament Translation, Aramaic Peshitta New Testament Translation- Messianic Version, and Aramaic Peshitta New Testament Vertical Interlinear (in three volumes)(2006). Magiera is connected to George Lamsa.
 The Way International - Aramaic-English Interlinear New Testament
 William Norton- A Translation, in English Daily Used, of the Peshito-Syriac Text, and of the Received Greek Text, of Hebrews, James, 1 Peter, and 1 John: With An Introduction On the Peshito-Syriac Text, and the Received Greek Text of 1881 and A Translation in English Daily Used: of the Seventeen Letters Forming Part of the Peshito-Syriac Books. William Norton was a Peshitta primacist, as shown in the introduction to his translation of Hebrews, James, I Peter, and I John. 
 Gorgias Press - Antioch Bible, a Peshitta text and translation of the Old Testament, New Testament, and Apocrypha.

Manuscripts
Although physical evidence has yet to be found, J.S. Assemane in his Bibliotheca stated that a Syriac Gospel dated 78 A.D. was found in Mesopotamia.

The following manuscripts are in the British Archives:
 British Library, Add. 14470 – complete text of 22 books, from the 5th/6th century
 Rabbula Gospels – a 6th-century illuminated Syriac Gospel Book
 Khaboris Codex – a 10th century complete Peshitta New Testament
 Codex Phillipps 1388 – a Syriac manuscript on parchment containing text of the four Gospels dated Palaeographically to the 5th/6th centuries
 British Library, Add. 12140 – a 6th century manuscript on parchment containing text from the four Gospels
 British Library, Add. 14479 – a 534 CE manuscript containing the 14 Pauline Epistles with some lacunae, dated by a colophon
 British Library, Add. 14455 – a 6th century heavily damaged manuscript containing parts of the four Gospels
 British Library, Add. 14466 – a 10th/11th century manuscript containing fragments of the gospels of Mark and Luke
 British Library, Add. 14467 – a 10th century manuscript containing fragments of Matthew and John in Syriac and Arabic
 British Library, Add. 14669 – a 6th century manuscript containing fragments of Luke and Mark.

See also 
 Bible translations into Aramaic
 Targum

References

Citations

Sources 

 Brock, Sebastian P. (2006) The Bible in the Syriac Tradition: English Version Gorgias Press LLC, 
 Dirksen, P. B. (1993). La Peshitta dell'Antico Testamento, Brescia, 
 Flesher, P. V. M. (ed.) (1998). Targum Studies Volume Two: Targum and Peshitta. Atlanta.
 Lamsa, George M. (1933). The Holy Bible from Ancient Eastern Manuscripts. .
 Pinkerton, J. and R. Kilgour (1920). The New Testament in Syriac. London: British and Foreign Bible Society, Oxford University Press.
 Pusey, Philip E. and G. H. Gwilliam (1901). Tetraevangelium Sanctum iuxta simplicem Syrorum versionem. Oxford University Press.
 Weitzman, M. P. (1999). The Syriac Version of the Old Testament: An Introduction. .

 Attribution

External links 

 Digital text of the Peshitta, Old and New Testament with full eastern vocalization
 The Peshitta divided in chapters, the New Testament with full western vocalization at syriacbible.nl
 Syriac Peshitta New Testament at archive.org
 Interlinear Aramaic/English New Testament also trilinear Old Testament (Hebrew/Aramaic/English)

Downloadable cleartext of English translations (Scripture.sf.net)
Murdock_NT_Peshitta
Norton_NT_Peshitta
Etheridge_NT_Peshitta

Syriac Christianity
2nd-century Christian texts
Catholic bibles